The Indian cricket team toured England in the 1979 season and played 16 first-class fixtures, winning only one, losing 3 and drawing 12.

India played four Test matches and lost the series to England 1-0 with three Tests drawn. England won the First Test at Edgbaston by an innings and 83 runs. The Second Test at Lord's, the Third Test at Headingley and the Fourth Test at The Oval were all drawn.

The Indian team was captained by Srinivasaraghavan Venkataraghavan and included notable players such as Sunil Gavaskar, Gundappa Viswanath, Dilip Vengsarkar, Bhagwat Chandrasekhar and Kapil Dev.

Test series summary

First Test

The England innings of 633/5d is the only example in Test cricket history where three different bowlers conceded 100+ runs and each failed to take a wicket: Srinivasaraghavan Venkataraghavan - 0-107, Karsan Ghavri - 0-129 and Bhagwat Chandrasekhar - 0-113.

Second Test

Third Test

Fourth Test

External sources
CricketArchive – tour itineraries

Annual reviews
 Playfair Cricket Annual 1980
 Wisden Cricketers' Almanack 1980

Further reading
 Ramachandra Guha, A Corner of a Foreign Field - An Indian History of a British Sport, Picador, 2001

References

1979 in Indian cricket
1979 in English cricket
1979
International cricket competitions from 1975–76 to 1980